）is a Japanese weekly geographical TV series broadcast domestically on NHK General Television and internationally on NHK World Premium hosted by Tamori. It started in 2008.

In the program, Tamori, accompanied by NHK's female broadcaster, strolls Japan's city or area with professional or amateur geologists, local historians or curators, and explores the place's terrain features and geological changes, as well as its history, culture and civil engineering. The title comes from the Japanese word 'burabura' ブラブラ which means wandering about, rambling, or strolling around.

The first three series of the program were broadcast late at night. In those series, Tamori could visit only within the Tokyo Metropolitan Area or at its vicinity as he was extremely busy with hosting the TV program Waratte Iitomo! every weekday. In Series4, it became a regular program to be aired on Saturdays from 7:30–8:15p.m., covering nationwide. Its viewership these days has been consistently over 10% since 2015, which is contributing to the program being one of NHK's highest viewership programs.

The program also publishes books for some episodes, which are available at major Japanese bookstores.

History 

The pilot version of the program was broadcast on December 14, 2008, from 0:20–1:03a.m.JST, and the regular series began airing from 10:00–10:43p.m.JST on October 1, 2009. The series had 15 episodes broadcast every Thursday until March 11, 2010. Yuka Kubota became assistant.

The second series, with 48 minutes each, began on October 7, 2010, and ended on March 31, 2011. It had 22 episodes.

The third series was broadcast from November 10, 2011, to April 5, 2012, with 19 episodes.

The fourth series was planned after Tamori resigned from his daily Fuji TV variety show Waratte Iitomo! in March 2014. NHK spokesman announced on January 21, 2015, that the new series would start airing again and Tamori would visit places outside Tokyo. The pilot episode was broadcast on January 6, 2015. Nachiko Shudo was the occasional Assistant of the episode. The regular series began airing on April 11, 2015. Each episode has 45 minutes, on Saturdays from 7:30–8:15p.m.JST. Maho Kuwako served as next Assistant until she handed over to Yurie Omi in April 2016. In April 2018 Risa Hayashida took over the job of Assistant from Omi.

Since April 2020, Rika Asano has been the 6th Assistant.

On February 9, 2022, NHK announced that Aoi Noguchi, working at Fukuoka Broadcasting Station, was supposed to take over the job of Assistant from Asano in April.

Current personalities 

 Tamori — host
 Aoi Noguchi — assistant
 Tsuyoshi Kusanagi — narrator
 Yōsui Inoue — theme music composer

Awards 

 May 11, 2011: The Association of Japanese Geographers Award
 September 29, 2015: Good Design Award 2015
 June 2, 2016: The 53rd Galaxy Award
 June 8, 2016: Hoso Bunka Foundation Award
 June 16, 2017: The Geological Society Award
 March 15, 2018: FY2017 Geotechnical Engineering Contribution Award
 2020: the 28th Hashida Award

References

External links 
Official Site (Japanese)

Japanese television series
NHK original programming
2008 Japanese television series debuts
2010s Japanese television series
2020s Japanese television series
Japanese-language television shows
Documentaries about geology
Documentary television series about science